List of all members of the Storting in the period 1961 to 1965.  The list includes all those initially elected to
Storting.

There were a total of 150 representatives, distributed among the parties: 74 to the Norwegian Labour Party, 29 to the Conservative Party of Norway, 16 to the Centre Party, 15 to the Christian Democratic Party, 14 to Venstre and 2 to the Socialist People's Party (currently named Socialist Left Party).

Aust-Agder

Vest-Agder

Before revote

After revote

As of March 2, 1962

Akershus

Bergen

Buskerud

Finnmark

Hedmark

Hordaland

Møre and Romsdal

Nordland

Oppland

Oslo

Rogaland

Sogn and Fjordane

Telemark

Troms

Nord-Trøndelag

Sør-Trøndelag

Vestfold

Østfold

 
Parliament of Norway, 1961–65